Juliette Armanet (born 4 March 1984) is a French singer.

She won the Album Révélation of the Year in 2018 at the Victoires de la Musique for Petite amie.

Discography

Studio albums

EPs

Singles

Other charted songs

Notes

References

External links 

 

French women singer-songwriters
French singer-songwriters
1984 births
Living people
21st-century French singers
21st-century French women singers